"Why a Duck?" is a comedy routine featured in the Marx Brothers movie The Cocoanuts (1929). In a scene in which Groucho and Chico are discussing a map, Groucho mentions the presence of a viaduct between the mainland and a peninsula. Chico, who is playing the role of an immigrant with poor English skills, replies "Why a duck?" This leads into a long schtick with Chico responding "Why a no chicken?", "I catch ona why a horse", and so forth.

"Why a Duck?" is a touchstone scene for Marx Brothers fans, as evidenced by Richard Anobile's book of the same name (featuring a foreword by Groucho) which focuses on the minutiae of the Marx Brothers' routines.

Duck as a theme

The duck is a recurring reference throughout the Marxes' and especially Groucho's career. His signature walk was called "the duck walk" and on Groucho's television program You Bet Your Life a stuffed duck made up to resemble Groucho would drop from the ceiling to give contestants money if they said the day's secret word.  Reportedly, when asked about the selection of a duck, Groucho answered "because a duck is such a silly animal". Ducks are the only animals that perform lines in the song "Everyone Says I Love You" in the Marx Brothers' film, Horse Feathers (1932). Their next film was called Duck Soup (1933), although no ducks or soup appear anywhere in the film except the title sequence.  In A Night At The Opera (1935), Groucho orders a duck egg for breakfast.

Cultural references to the "why a duck?" routine
"Why A Duck?" (radio program)

See also
Inherently funny word
Duck: cultural references

References

Comedy sketches
Marx Brothers
Quotations from film
1930s neologisms
Comedy catchphrases